Max Mirnyi and Daniel Nestor were the defending champions, but decided not to participate.
Unseeded pair Marcelo Melo and Tommy Robredo won the title, defeating Eric Butorac and Paul Hanley in the final, 4–6, 6–1, [10–5].

Seeds

Draw

Draw

References
 Main Draw

Brisbane International - Doubles
Men's Doubles